Barwas is a village in Loharu Tehsil of Bhiwani district in Haryana, India.

Administration
Currently, it is under Bhiwani Zilla Panchayat and has its own unreserved Gram Panchayat under Gram Panchayat Smiti. There is a Patwari (government land record officer), an ADO (Agriculture Development Officer),a Rural Health Officer (RHO), and an Anganbadi Worker.

See also

 Bidhwan
 Badya Jattan
 Mandholi Kalan
 Kanwari
 Zaildar
 List of Zaildars by Zail

References

External links
 Google location map

External links
 Haryana Government e-Services
 Bhiwani District Website
 e-Disha e-services
 Government of India e-services

Villages in Bhiwani district
Archaeological sites in Haryana